Sri Jayaram Engineering College is co-educational engineering college established in 2002. It is located in Cuddalore, a district capital in the state of Tamil Nadu, India.

The college campus is about 2 km away from Cuddalore OT Railway Station and 22 km away from Pondicherry.  Regular bus services operate to nearby towns, including Pondicherry, Panruti, Chidambaram, Vadalur, Neyveli and Viruthachalam.  Separate hostel facilities are available for boys and girls. The school is affiliated with Anna University, Tiruchirappalli.

External links
home page

Engineering colleges in Tamil Nadu
Colleges affiliated to Anna University
Education in Cuddalore district
Educational institutions established in 2002
2002 establishments in Tamil Nadu
Cuddalore